Wahachee Creek is a stream in the U.S. state of Georgia. It is a tributary to the Broad River.

Wahachee is a name derived from the Muskogean language meaning "mighty wolf". A variant name is "Wahatchee Creek".

References

Rivers of Georgia (U.S. state)
Rivers of Elbert County, Georgia